Pietro Rota (1600 – 12 February 1657) was a Roman Catholic prelate who served as Bishop of Lucca (1650–1657).

Biography
Pietro Rota was born in Ravenna, Italy in 1600.
On 27 June 1650, he was appointed during the papacy of Pope Innocent X as Bishop of Lucca.
On 3 July 1650, he was consecrated bishop by Marcantonio Franciotti, Cardinal-Priest of Santa Maria della Pace, with Luca Torreggiani, Archbishop of Ravenna, and Ranuccio Scotti Douglas, Bishop Emeritus of Borgo San Donnino, serving as co-consecrators. 
He served as Bishop of Lucca until his death on 12 February 1657.

References 

17th-century Italian Roman Catholic bishops
Bishops appointed by Pope Innocent X
1600 births
1657 deaths